Nizhneye Inkho is a rural locality (a selo) in Gumbetovsky District, Republic of Dagestan, Russia. The population was 1,339 as of 2010. There are 4 streets.

Geography 
Nizhneye Inkho is located 33 km south of Mekhelta (the district's administrative centre) by road. Verkhneye Inkho and Kilyatl are the nearest rural localities.

References 

Rural localities in Gumbetovsky District